The 1983 Summer Universiade, also known as the 1983 World University Games or XII Summer Universiade, took place in Edmonton, Alberta, Canada between July 1 and 12, 1983. Over 2400 athletes from 73 countries participated. It was the first time Canada hosted these Games. Edmonton also hosted the 1978 Commonwealth Games.

The event was marred by tragedy from the death of Soviet diver Sergei Chalibashvili when he died eight days after hitting his head on the 10 m diving platform in competition while attempting a reverse 3½ in the tuck position.

The Prince of Wales (now Charles III) opened the Universiade accompanied by the Princess of Wales (Diana), and other dignitaries and celebrities also visited.

In October 2005, Edmonton was selected as a potential bid candidate to host the 2011 Summer Universiade by the Canadian Interuniversity Sport (CIS).

Sports
 
 
 
 Road cycling (4)
 Track cycling (8)

Venues

 Commonwealth Stadium
 Argyll Velodrome (track cycling)
 Hawrelak Park (road cycling)
 Northlands Coliseum
 Universiade Pavilion (basketball)

Medal table

Participating nations

Around 2,400 athletes from 73 nations took part.

References

 
1983
U
U
Summer Universiade, 1983
U
University and college sports in Canada
Multi-sport events in Canada
Summer Universiade
Summer Universiade